"Heat Wave" is a popular song written by Irving Berlin for the 1933 musical As Thousands Cheer, and introduced in the show by Ethel Waters.

Film appearances
1938: The song was featured in the film Alexander's Ragtime Band, where it was performed by Ethel Merman. 
1946: It was also featured in the film Blue Skies, where it was performed by Olga San Juan.
1954: There's No Business Like Show Business, where it was performed by Marilyn Monroe. (Note: based on the lyrics alone, the Marilyn song is different, and within the film's narrative, Monroe's version is a sexier variant of the original that's "stolen" from Ethel Merman's character). 
1954: A snippet of the song can be heard in a medley in the film White Christmas, sung by Bing Crosby and Danny Kaye.
1981: Miss Piggy sings it in The Muppets Go to the Movies.
1993: A snippet of the song can be heard in the film Grumpy Old Men, sung by Ella Fitzgerald.

Notable recordings
There were three chart hits in 1933 by:
Ethel Waters
Glen Gray and the Casa Loma Orchestra – vocal by Mildred Bailey
Meyer Davis – vocal by Charlotte Murray.

Other versions 
1952: Lee Wiley on the album Lee Wiley Sings Irving Berlin.
1955: Margaret Whiting for Capitol Records CL14242.
1956: Bing Crosby also recorded the song on his album Bing Sings Whilst Bregman Swings.
1958: Ella Fitzgerald sang the song on her album Ella Fitzgerald Sings the Irving Berlin Songbook.
1961: Enoch Light gave a symphonic treatment of the song, which can be found on the album Stereo 35-MM.
1975: Bing Crosby on his 1975 album At My Time of Life.
1979: James White and the Blacks on the 1979 album Off White.
1995: Patti LuPone and the Hollywood Bowl Orchestra on the album Heatwave: Patti LuPone Sings Irving Berlin.

References

Songs written by Irving Berlin
Songs from As Thousands Cheer
1933 songs
Marilyn Monroe songs
Mildred Bailey songs
Ethel Waters songs
Songs about weather